Mary Morgan-Richards is a New Zealand biologist, and as of 2019 is a full professor at the Massey University.

Academic career
In 1995, Morgan-Richard's completed a PhD thesis titled  'Weta Karyotypes: the Systematic Significance of Their Variation'  at the Victoria University of Wellington. Between 1996 and 2003, she worked at the University of St Andrews, University of Otago, the Natural History Museum, London, and the University of Canterbury successively. In 2005 Morgan-Richards moved to the Massey University, rising to full professor in 2018.

Research
Morgan-Richard's research has focused on topics in evolutionary biology such as speciation and hybridisation, as well as conservation biology, using population genetics, and phylogenetic methods.

Native New Zealand invertebrates including wētā, stick insects, and snails are often the subject of her research. She has scientifically described multiple species of wētā.
Morgan-Richard's phylogenetic research has also focused on birds and their parasites.

Taxa named in Morgan-Richard's honour
 Peripatoides morgani Trewick, 1998

Books 
 Trewick, Steve, & Morgan-Richards, Mary. (2019). Wild Life New Zealand. Hand-in-Hand Press, New Zealand, .

Selected research 
 Morgan-Richards, Mary, Trewick, Steve A., Bartosch-Härlid, Anna, Kardailsky, Olga, Phillips, Matthew J., McLenachan, Patricia A., & Penny, David. (2008). "Bird evolution: testing the Metaves clade with six new mitochondrial genomes." BMC Evolutionary Biology 8 (1): 20.
 Pratt, Renae C., Gibb, Gillian C., Morgan-Richards, Mary, Phillips, Matthew J., Hendy, Michael D., & Penny, David. (2008). "Toward resolving deep Neoaves phylogeny: data, signal enhancement, and priors." Molecular Biology and Evolution 26 (2): 313–326.
 Pratt, Renae C., Morgan-Richards, Mary, & Trewick, Steve A. (2008). "Diversification of New Zealand weta (Orthoptera: Ensifera: Anostostomatidae) and their relationships in Australasia." Philosophical Transactions of the Royal Society B: Biological Sciences 363 (1508): 3427–3437.
 Trewick, Steven A., & Morgan‐Richards, Mary. (2005). "After the deluge: mitochondrial DNA indicates Miocene radiation and Pliocene adaptation of tree and giant weta (Orthoptera: Anostostomatidae)." Journal of Biogeography 32 (2): 295–309.

References

External links
 

Living people
New Zealand women academics
Year of birth missing (living people)
Victoria University of Wellington alumni
Academic staff of the Massey University
New Zealand biologists
Evolutionary biologists